Cansel Deniz (born 26 August 1991) is a Kazakhstani taekwondo practitioner.

She represented Kazakhstan at the 2016 Summer Olympics in Rio de Janeiro, in the women's 67 kg.

At the 2018 Asian Games, she clinched a silver medal in the women's +67kg event losing to South Korean Lee Da-bin.

References

External links

 

1991 births
Living people
People from Akmola Region
Kazakhstani female taekwondo practitioners
Olympic taekwondo practitioners of Kazakhstan
Taekwondo practitioners at the 2016 Summer Olympics
Universiade medalists in taekwondo
Taekwondo practitioners at the 2018 Asian Games
Medalists at the 2018 Asian Games
Asian Games silver medalists for Kazakhstan
Asian Games medalists in taekwondo
Universiade silver medalists for Kazakhstan
Medalists at the 2017 Summer Universiade
Taekwondo practitioners at the 2020 Summer Olympics
Islamic Solidarity Games medalists in taekwondo
Islamic Solidarity Games competitors for Kazakhstan
21st-century Kazakhstani women